"You Taught Me to Love Again" is a 1939 song written and recorded by Tommy Dorsey and released as a 78 single.

Tommy Dorsey composed the music with Henri Woode while Charles Carpenter wrote the lyrics. The song was published by Larry Spier Music, Inc. The song was released as a Victor 78 single, 26154, by Tommy Dorsey and His Orchestra in 1939. The song appeared on the 2001 compilation album The Chronological Classics: Tommy Dorsey and His Orchestra: 1938-1939 on Classics.

Other recordings
Gene Krupa and His Orchestra released the song as a 78 single on Brunswick, 8400, in 1939.  Sarah Vaughan released the song on Columbia, 38810, in 1949 as a 78. The song appears on the album The Divine Sarah Vaughan: The Columbia Years, 1949-1953. Fletcher Henderson also performed the song with Chuck Richards on vocals for an NBC radio broadcast released on the 1994 collection Fletcher Henderson: Live At The Grand Terrace, Chicago, 1938 on Jazz Band.

References

Sources
 Levinson, Peter J. Tommy Dorsey: Livin' in a Great Big Way: A Biography. Cambridge, MA: Da Capo Press, 2005.  
 Stockdale, Robert L. Tommy Dorsey: On The Side. Metuchen, NJ: The Scarecrow Press, 1995.

External links 
 Online version available on the Jazz Anthology website: http://www.jazz-on-line.com/pageinterrogation.php

Tommy Dorsey songs
1939 songs
Songs written by Tommy Dorsey